Ugly  is a 2013 Indian Hindi-language thriller film written, co-produced and directed by Anurag Kashyap. Jointly produced by Phantom Films and DAR Motion Pictures, the film stars Rahul Bhat, Ronit Roy, Tejaswini Kolhapure, Vineet Kumar Singh, Girish Kulkarni, Surveen Chawla and Anshika Shrivastava in the lead roles. It also features TV actor Abir Goswami in his last film appearance before his death in 2013. Told in the course of a week, Ugly follows the story of a struggling actor Rahul Varshney (Bhat), whose daughter Kali (Shrivastava) disappears, and the events that follow.

Kashyap had the idea for the film since 2006 and started writing the script after talking to one of his friends, who was in the Special Task Force, Lucknow, about kidnapping cases. He chose actors who could connect with the characters in the film. The film's background score and music were composed by Brian McOmber and G. V. Prakash Kumar respectively, while Gaurav Solanki wrote the lyrics. Nikos Andritsakis served as the film's cinematographer and Aarti Bajaj was its editor.

Ugly premiered in the Directors' Fortnight section at the 2013 Cannes Film Festival. It was also screened at the 2014 New York Indian Film Festival, the third Ladakh International Film Festival and the Indian Film Festival of Los Angeles. The digital poster of the film was released on 8 May 2013. The circumstances that led to the birth of Kali were separately made as short film, titled Kali Katha, and was released in YouTube on 23 December 2014. The film was theatrically released on 26 December 2014 after a two-year delay due to Kashyap's refusal to carry static anti-smoking warnings in the film. He had filed a case in court, but ultimately lost it. Upon release, the film received critical acclaim and was a commercial success, grossing over  worldwide.

Plot 
Shalini is a depressed housewife who attempts suicide, but is interrupted by her ten-year-old daughter from her first marriage, Kali. Shalini calls her husband DCP (Detection) Shoumik Bose, asking for money but he refuses. Her brother Siddhant tries to convince Bose to smuggle iPhones. Rahul, Shalini's first husband and Kali's biological father, takes Kali to a work assignment, where she chooses to stay in the car. While Rahul is waiting for his casting director, a toy seller tries to catch Kali's attention with children's masks. Chaitanya soon arrives and gives Rahul a film script and informs him that Kali was not in his car. The duo rush back and find her missing. Chaitanya asks the toy-seller about Kali and notices that he has her phone. The man tries to get away but is eventually killed by a car while being chased by the two. They later go to the police station to report Kali's disappearance. The local police inspector Jadhav asks Rahul why he was travelling with his daughter. Rahul says that since his divorce, he can only meet Kali on Saturdays. Two officers find the mask seller's house and ask his aunt about Kali, but she claims to know nothing.

Bose taps Shalini's phone and listens to her conversation with Rakhee, a B-grade film actress. After being informed of his step daughter's kidnapping, he arrives at the station and beats Chaitanya. Bose accuses Rahul of the kidnapping and shows him the recording of Rahul and Shalini's conversation where she did not want Kali to meet him. Bose later reminds him of their college days when he used to bully him. Disguising his voice, Chaitanya calls Rahul and demands ransom. The call is received by Bose instead. Chaitanya also informs his agent to conduct an audition of ten-year-old girls to re-create dialogues for a ransom call. Next day, Jadhav follows Chaitanya into his office, where the police tap his phone and find out that he is in debt. He is arrested on suspicion of kidnapping Kali. Rahul escapes from the police captivity after a doctor arrives for his check-up. Later, Bose overhears one of Shalini's conversations, in which she explains how Rahul used to beat her after marriage and how she met Bose after filing a complaint. Jadhav interrogates Chaitanya who says that he had called for ransom because Bose was more interested in his personal grudge with Rahul than the kidnapping. Rahul tells Bose that Chaitanya could have not kidnapped Kali since he is aware of Rahul's lack of funds. The police expand their search operation.

Chaitanya uses a girl's audition to demand ransom from Rahul. Rahul, who is at Rakhee's place, tells Chaitanya about the call, which is tapped by the police. Chaitanya tells him to talk to Bose, who can arrange the money. Later, Rakhee urges Shalini to pay the ransom. Chaitanya is subsequently arrested by the police, and Rahul, who escapes, is later arrested after he tries to rob a jewelry store. Rakhee calls Rahul, and using the same recorded voice, demands ransom. Rakhee eventually flees, stealing the money. Bose asks her about the money, but she does not answer and shoots him in the shoulder. Siddhant is then arrested with the money. Jadhav tells Rahul to deliver the money to the kidnapper but Chaitanya evades police interception and throws away his phone. Rahul, Chaitanya and Rakhee now have the money and Rahul calls Bose to taunt him. Realizing that Bose is unaware of Kali's whereabouts, Rahul murders Chaitanya, whilst Rakhee quietly leaves with the money. The police revisit the marketplace and talk to a woman who knew the toy seller, and find out that they have a history of abducting children. The woman finally leads the police to Kali inside the sidecar of a bike, where she is found dead. The police discover that she had been kidnapped by the toy-seller, who had previously died in the chase.

Cast 
 Rahul Bhat as Rahul Kapoor/Varshney
 Ronit Roy as Shoumik Bose
 Tejaswini Kolhapure as Shalini Bose
 Alia Bhatt as Young Shalini (cameo appearance)
 Vineet Kumar Singh as Chaitanya Mishra
 Surveen Chawla as Rakhee Malhotra
 Siddhanth Kapoor as Siddhant
 Girish Kulkarni as Inspector Jadhav
 Abir Goswami as ACP Gupta
 Anshika Shrivastava as Kali Varshney
 Saharsh Kumar Shukla as Gangster Pujari

Production

Development 
Director Anurag Kashyap said in an interview that the genesis of Ugly started from his own broken marriage and the relationship with his daughter. He mentioned that his guilt of not spending enough time with her when he was an alcoholic also shaped the film. He stated that the first ten minutes of the film stems from his personal experiences. He had been working on its script since 2006. Later, Kashyap met his friend Amit Pathak, who was the head of Special Task Force in Lucknow and talked to him about real life kidnapping cases and how they were tackled. He also explained the whole "logic" of such kidnapping cases and how they function. The shocking thing for Kashyap to know from him was that in eighty five percent cases of kidnapping, there are no ransom calls, and are vendetta based abductions. He later included several real-life incidents in the script like a case of an Indian Administrative Service officer whose wife filed a case of brutality against him.

After the research, Kashyap finished the script and gave it to some people to read who felt that "it was a very dark and intense film". He said: "I knew that I could make it only after I had made a successful film. So Gangs of Wasseypur allowed me the freedom to make this film without sharing the script with anyone. I just told people I wanted to make a kidnapping drama and to trust me." The film's story is told over the course of a week. Kashyap announced Ugly in May 2012.

Casting 
For casting, Kashyap chose actors who could connect with the characters in the film. He found a lot of parallels between Rahul Bhat's real life and his character in the film and hence gave him the role of a failed actor. The two had previously discussed the project in 2012. To prepare for his role, Bhat started consuming alcohol heavily and deprived himself of sleep to create dark circles around his character's face. Tejaswini Kolhapure, per Kashyap knew "what happens when you make bad choices in life", as her first film choice, Paanch, directed by Kashyap, was never released. She plays the role of an alcoholic mother, for which she actually consumed alcohol while shooting. Ronit Roy was cast in the role of a senior police officer.

Vineet Kumar Singh was cast in the role of a casting director. Kashyap had seen Girish Kulkarni in films such as Vihir (2010) and Deool (2011) and wanted to work with him. He met their director Umesh Vinayak Kulkarni in Denmark, who told him that Kulkarni would love to work with him. Afterwards Kashyap came back and called him for Ugly. Surveen Chawla plays the role of a C-grade film actress, who she described as "crass, downmarket C-grade item girl who is ugly on the inside". The film has television actor Abir Goswami's last appearance before his death in 2013. Siddhanth Kapoor was cast in Ugly before his debut film Shootout at Wadala (2013), since he wanted to work with Kashyap. Alia Bhatt makes a brief appearance in the film.

Filming 
Kashyap shot the whole film without giving its lead actors any script as he felt the film "required" that. During shoot, he would brief the actors about the scene and let them emote to do their own bit, while the camera was kept rolling. The actors got to know about the film, when it premiered at the Cannes Film Festival. Kashyap had told Bhat and other cast that he wanted to make this film in 2012. They spent the next two years, talking to each other and getting to know each other. The little girl in the film is named Kali (Hindi for bud), who, according to author Vaiju Naravane, represents "untouched innocence". Anshika Shrivastava, who played the character, was unaware of the story, and Kashyap requested her parents not to show her the film as he felt she was too young for the subject matter. On the day of shooting, Kashyap gave Roy the scene for the day which he refused to read and said: "I told Anurag that now that there was no script, I'll leave the shooting entirely on him." For a sequence, where Bhat had to cry, Kashyap kept talking to him for three hours and he eventually broke down and wept. The camera kept rolling during that period. The film was extensively shot in real locations. While shooting a scene where his character is taken in remand by the police, Singh was slapped over fifty times in real. His hands were cuffed and tied to the roof to represent the actual third degree torture. It was because Kashyap wanted to depict a realistic reconstruction of police methods in India. A scene where both Singh and Bhat talk to the inspector in the police station was improvised, because, Kashyap wanted to show the real "police apathy and the power trip."

Kashyap shot the whole film in the suburbs of Mumbai to create the feeling of constriction. He worked with a new cinematographer, Nikos Andritsakis, who works with Dibakar Banerjee, as he wanted to shoot in the "constricted spaces" of the city. They shot most of the scenes in one or two angles. The suburbs were difficult locations to shoot because of the constant crowd hence the team then decided to use hidden cameras to capture most of the original scenes, especially the ones that were shot at Bandra and Lonavala railway station. As a result, the actors did not have the liberty to give as many retakes as they can on a set. Kashyap called it his most "brutally honest" film. Ugly was shot for fourteen hours a day to meet the schedule and was completed in forty days. Kashyap wanted the scene where Siddhant gets the money to be hyper-stylised, and he treated the scene "like an orgasm". He drew similarity of the scene with a man's eagerness to have sex, which is sudden and intense. He recalled the whole shooting an "emotionally exhausting" experience.

Post-production 
Ugly was edited by Aarti Bajaj and the sound mixing was done by the Mumbai-based audio engineer Mandar Kulkarni with assistance from Alok De. Such scenes as a road accident in the film were shot on different places and later merged using visual effects provided by Balakrishna P. Subbiah Nadar. The film is jointly produced by Phantom Films and DAR Motion Pictures.

Soundtrack 

The film's album soundtrack is composed by Tamil film composer G. V. Prakash Kumar. This is his third Hindi film he composed after Joker and Gangs of Wasseypur, in which he composed the background score for the two-part series. All songs were written by Gaurav Solanki, except one track "Ugly" was written by Vineet Kumar Singh. Artists like  Kumar, Shilpa Rao, Singh, Ishq Bector, Christopher Stanley, Barkha Swaroop Saxena and Shree D provided vocals. Brian McOmber provided the background score. The album rights are acquired by Zee Music Company and consists of five songs. It was released on 24 November 2014. According to a critic from Sify, the song "Nichod De" mocked the item numbers and their corny music and lyrics.

Marketing and release 

Ugly premiered in the Directors' Fortnight section of the 2013 Cannes Film Festival where it received standing ovation. It was also screened at the third Ladakh International Film Festival, the 2014 New York Indian Film Festival and the Indian Film Festival of Los Angeles. Kashyap had initially intended for the film to release in 2013 but it was delayed as he had filed a petition challenging Cigarettes and Tobacco Products Act, which makes it compulsory for filmmakers to crop or mask any scenes depicting the use of any tobacco, in India. However, Bombay High Court refused to give any concessions. The Central Board of Film Certification required a "Smoking is Injurious to Health" static warning to be posted in the lower right corner of the frame whenever a character in the film is shown smoking. Kashyap fought this regulation stating, "it's the Health Ministry that should take the responsibility of curbing use of tobacco and work towards measures to control it and films should not be a medium to advertise non-smoking." Kashyap initially stated that he was not going to release the film until the Board decides to abolish the rule, but after several months of negotiations, he chose to release it with the warning.

The circumstances that led to the birth of the little girl Kali were separately made as a short film titled Kali Katha. It was released in YouTube on 23 December 2014. A digital poster of the film was released on 15 May 2013, which was followed by the first theatrical trailer on 12 September 2013. The release date was pushed to next year when he second trailer was launched on 15 December 2014. Kashyap had also changed his Twitter handle to "UGLYAnurag", as part of the promotional strategy. A special screening of the film was held in Mumbai on 23 December 2014, which was attended by several actors including Shahid Kapoor and Alia Bhatt. Kashyap said that he saw people reaching out to their children after watching the film which he felt was his purpose behind making the film.

Ugly was released in India on 26 December 2014 in 300–400 screens, majorly in the metro cities. Several trade analysts had predicted that the film would only cater to a niche audience. The film was also theatrically released in France and Belgium. It was released on DVD on 1 March 2015 and is also available on Amazon Prime Video.

Reception

Critical reception 
Upon release, Ugly received widespread critical acclaim. Film critic Raja Sen called it Kashyap's "finest film", writing: "Ugly is a tale of torment, masterfully woven around the universally urgent trigger of a disappearing minor." Shweta Kaushal, giving the film a positive review, called it "dark, gripping" and a "must watch". Kaushani Banerjee of Deccan Chronicle wrote: "Every frame has a dark undertone and Ugly does not conclude until every possible avenue of audience empathy is explored." Mihir Fadnavis of Firstpost called Ugly, Kashyap's "best film since Black Friday". A review carried by India Today called the film an "eye opener" and "one of the best films of the year". Saibal Chatterjee of NDTV, called it "indescribably better than all the muck that mainstream Bollywood passed off for entertainment this year." Meena Iyer of The Times of India gave a four-out-of-five star rating and said: "It's not for the faint-hearted, but for those who are willing to let the morally decrepit live." Subhash K. Jha in his review mentioned, "You know these characters are played by actors. And that there is a camera recording their activities. But you let yourself believe this is not make-believe." Suprateek Chatterjee from HuffPost gave a positive review to the film and called Kashyap the "antithesis of Sooraj Barjatya". Arunava Chatterjee called Ugly a "pathbreaking crime fiction" and "one of Kashyap's best so far." Sonia Chopra of Sify gave a positive response and wrote: "Kashyap gives us a film that represents a disturbing reflection of life."

Contrary to the positive responses, a review from Bollywood Hungama wrote, "Watch it if you are an Anurag Kashyap fan, else avoid!". Shubhra Gupta of The Indian Express giving the film a two-star-out-of five rating, wrote: "In all the to-ing and fro-ing, it starts feeling too long, and too much, without the requisite emotional pay-off." Deepanjana Pal wrote in her review, "Ugly is a disappointment, not just because it's a whodunit that sinks like a badly-made souffle but also because we expect better and more of Kashyap."

Among overseas reviewers, Lee Marshall of Screen International called the film a "lazy kidnap caper" and felt the story was "too flabby". Deborah Young of The Hollywood Reporter mentioned in her review that Ugly is "taut, angry genre film" but felt the film was comparatively weaker than Kashyap's earlier film, Gangs of Wasseypur (2012). Maggie Lee from Variety gave a positive response and wrote :"[..] the grittily stylized film boasts a scattershot narrative that frustrates as much as it illuminates."

Box-office 
Ugly was the last release of 2014 in India. It received a low occupancy and earned  on its opening day, which was mainly attributed to the limited release and small scale promotion. The film was expected to be pulled off from screens but positive critical reception helped in the increase of numbers at the box-office. It collected  over the weekend. It also benefited from the limited print release which meant that there won't be much reduction in print count in the next weeks. The film was also released in France and Belgium, where it grossed 80,000 euros in its first week.

After the end of the first week of its theatrical release, Ugly collected  at the box office. According to Rentrak, a global media measurement company, the film collected a total of  after the end of its theatrical run.

References

External links 
 

2013 thriller films
2013 films
Indian thriller films
2010s Hindi-language films
Films directed by Anurag Kashyap
Films about kidnapping in India
Films about missing people
Films shot in Mumbai
Films with screenplays by Anurag Kashyap
Hindi-language thriller films
Fictional portrayals of the Maharashtra Police
Films set in Mumbai
Films shot in Jaipur
Films shot in Uttar Pradesh